Acanthurus triostegus, also known as the convict tang, convict surgeonfish, or manini, is a small surgeonfish in family Acanthuridae of the order Perciformes. These tangs are widespread. They are found in the Indo-Pacific except for seas around the Arabian Peninsula, in the Pacific at the Hawaiian Islands, and in the Eastern Pacific they are found in the lower Gulf of California and down to Panama, including the Revillagigedo Islands, Clipperton Island, Cocos Island, and Galápagos Islands with some reports throughout the Mediterranean and Adriatic Sea most likely entering through the Suez Canal.

Description
The convict tang is so called because of its bold black stripes on a yellowish background. The head is small with a pointed snout and a terminal mouth with thick lips. It has six black stripes which distinguishes it from the zebra tang (Acanthurus polyzona) which has nine, and has a more restricted range in the Indian Ocean. The first black stripe is oblique and passes through the eye. There are two black spots on the caudal peduncle, and on each side there is a sharp, retractable spine, which is used in offence or defence.

Distribution and habitat
Acanthurus triostegus occurs in the tropical Indo-Pacific region. Its range extends from the East African coast and Madagascar to southwestern Japan, Australia and Central America, including many Pacific island groups. It is found over hard bottoms in lagoons, reef slopes, bays and estuaries.

References

External links

 
 

Acanthurus
Fish of the Indian Ocean
Fish of the Pacific Ocean
Fish of Hawaii
Fish of Palau
Fish described in 1758
Taxa named by Carl Linnaeus